Llancillo Church (also spelled Llancilo) is a Grade II*-listed redundant church in Herefordshire, England, near the Welsh border at .

Situated amongst trees and fields, it was dedicated to Saint Peter and alternatively to St Tysilio. The church was built in the 11th century and has been revised and restored since, including a Victorian restoration in the 1890s.

It contains a font from the 13th century and 17th century pulpit. One of the bells is believed to have been cast in the 13th century or earlier.

History

It is thought that the remote site was first used by a hermit in the 6th century but that the current chancel dates from the 11th century and the rest of the church was substantially rebuilt in the 17th century.  It underwent Victorian restoration in the 1890s.

Despite being situated in Herefordshire, on the English side of the border, the church lay within the Welsh Diocese of St David's until 1852 when it was transferred to the Diocese of Hereford.

On 22 December 2006, the building was closed for regular public worship and, in 2007, passed to the Friends of Friendless Churches to maintain and restore. Whilst Llancillo remains a civil parish, it now falls within the Church of England parish of Rowlestone and Llancillo.

Architecture

The sandstone building has a slate roof, and tufa dressings. One of the bells in the bellcote was cast possibly in the 13th century or earlier.

There is a Tudor doorway and, inside, a 13th-century baptismal font.  The oak pulpit is from 1632.

In the churchyard are the remains of a 14th century preaching cross with an octagonal base. Nearby is mound which is the site of a motte castle.

The church lies on the Walterstone ley line described by Alfred Watkins in his book, The Old Straight Track.

References

Churches in Herefordshire
Churches preserved by the Friends of Friendless Churches
Grade II* listed churches in Herefordshire